The Immigration and Nationality Act of 1965, also known as the Hart–Celler Act and more recently as the 1965 Immigration Act, is a federal law passed by the 89th United States Congress and signed into law by President Lyndon B. Johnson. The law abolished the National Origins Formula, which had been the basis of U.S. immigration policy since the 1920s. The act removed de facto discrimination against Southern and Eastern Europeans and Asians, as well as other non-Western and Northern European ethnic groups from American immigration policy.

The National Origins Formula had been established in the 1920s to preserve American homogeneity by promoting immigration from Western and Northern Europe. During the 1960s, at the height of the civil rights movement, this approach increasingly came under attack for being racially discriminatory. With the support of the Johnson administration, Senator Philip Hart and Congressman Emanuel Celler introduced a bill to repeal the formula. The bill received wide support from both northern Democratic and Republican members of Congress, but strong opposition mostly from Southern Democrats, the latter mostly voting Nay or Not Voting. President Johnson signed the Immigration and Nationality Act of 1965 into law on October 3, 1965. In opening entry to the U.S. to immigrants other than Northwestern Europeans, the Act significantly altered immigration demographics in the country for the first time since it was founded.

The Immigration and Nationality Act of 1965 created a seven-category preference system that gives priority to relatives and children of U.S. citizens and legal permanent residents, professionals and other individuals with specialized skills, and refugees. The act also set a numerical limit on immigration (120,000 per annum) from the Western Hemisphere for the first time in U.S. history. While proponents of the bill had argued that it would not have a significant effect on the total level of immigration or the demographic mix of the country, it nevertheless increased the total number of immigrants as well as the share of immigrants from Asia and Africa, as well as Eastern and Southern Europe in the following decades.

Background
The Immigration and Nationality Act of 1965 marked a radical break from U.S. immigration policies of the past. Since Congress restricted naturalized citizenship to "white persons" in 1790, laws restricted immigration from Asia and Africa, and gave preference to Northern and Western Europeans over Southern and Eastern Europeans. During this time, most of those immigrating to the U.S. were Northern Europeans of Protestant faith and Western Africans who were forced to immigrate because of slavery. This pattern shifted in the mid to late 19th century for both the Western and Eastern regions of the United States. There was a large influx of immigration from Asia in the Western region, while Eastern and Southern European immigrants settled more in the Eastern United States.

Once the demographics of immigration were changing, there were policies put in place to reduce immigration to exclude individuals of certain ethnicities and races. Congress passed the Chinese Exclusion Act of 1882 to stop the inflow of Chinese immigrants. Then in 1917, Congress passed the Immigration Act; this act had prevented most immigration of non-North Western Europeans because it tested language understanding. This act was followed by the Emergency Immigration Act of 1921, that placed a quota on immigration which used the rate of immigration in 1910 to mirror the immigration rate of all countries. The Emergency Immigration Act of 1921 had helped bring along the Immigration Act of 1924 had permanently established the National Origins Formula as the basis of U.S. immigration policy, largely to restrict immigration from Asia, Southern Europe, and Eastern Europe. According to the Office of the Historian of the U.S. Department of State, the purpose of the 1924 Act was "to preserve the ideal of U.S. homogeneity" by limiting immigration from Southern and Eastern Europe. At the time the U.S. had been recognized by many as the global leader in codified racism. The National Socialist Handbook for Law and Legislation of 1934–35, edited by the lawyer Hans Frank, contains a pivotal essay by Herbert Kier on the recommendations for race legislation which devoted a quarter of its pages to U.S. legislation, including race-based citizenship laws, anti-miscegenation laws, and immigration laws. Adolf Hitler wrote of his admiration of America's immigration laws in Mein Kampf, saying:

In the 1960s, the United States faced both foreign and domestic pressures to change its nation-based formula, which was regarded as a system that discriminated based on an individual's place of birth. Abroad, former military allies and new independent nations aimed to de-legitimize discriminatory immigration, naturalization and regulations through international organizations like the United Nations. In the United States, the national-based formula had been under scrutiny for a number of years. In 1952, President Truman had directed the Commission on Immigration and Naturalization to conduct an investigation and produce a report on the current immigration regulations. The report, Whom We Shall Welcome, served as the blueprint for the Immigration and Nationality Act of 1965. At the height of the Civil Rights Movement the restrictive immigration laws were seen as an embarrassment. At the time of the act's passing, many high-ranking politicians favored this bill to be passed, including President Lyndon B. Johnson. However, the public did not reciprocate these feelings, which can be seen in a Gallup Organization poll in 1965 asking if they were in favor of getting rid of the national quota act, and only 51 percent were in favor. The act was pressured by high-ranking officials and interest groups to be passed, which it was passed on October 3, 1965. President Lyndon B. Johnson signed the 1965 act into law at the foot of the Statue of Liberty, ending preferences for white immigrants dating to the 18th century.

The Immigration and Nationality Act of 1965 did not make it fully illegal for the United States government to discriminate against individuals, which included members of the LGBTQ+ community to be prohibited under the legislation. The Immigration and Naturalization Service continued to deny entry to prospective immigrants who are in the LGBTQ+ community on the grounds that they were "mentally defective", or had a "constitutional psychopathic inferiority" until the Immigration Act of 1990 rescinded the provision discriminating against members of the LGBT+ community.

Legislative history 
The Immigration and Nationality Act of 1965 has a long history of trying to get passed by Congress. This act has been introduced a number of times to the Senate between March 14, 1960, when it was first introduced, to August 19, 1965, which was the last time it was presented. It was hard to pass this law under Kennedy's administration because Senator James Eastland (D-MS), Representative Michael Feighan (D-OH), and Representative Francis Walter (D-PA), who were in control of the immigration subcommittees, were against immigration reform. When President Lyndon B. Johnson became president on January 8, 1964, he pressured Congress to act upon reform in immigration. However, this president's support did not stop the debate of the Immigration and Nationality Act of 1965 until January 4, 1965, when President Johnson focused his inaugural address on the reform of immigration, which created intense pressure for the heads of the congressional immigration subcommittees.

Immigration and Nationality Act of 1965 in the 89th Congress 
With the support of President Johnson's Administration, Representative Emanuel Celler (D-NY) introduced the Immigration and Nationality bill, H.R. 2580. Emanuel Celler was a senior representative, as well as the Chair of the House Judiciary Committee. When Celler introduced the bill, he knew that it would be hard for this bill to move from the committee to the floor successfully; the bill's committee was the Immigration and Nationality subcommittee. The chair of the subcommittee was Representative Feighan, who was against immigration reform. In the end, a compromise was made where immigration based on familial reunification is more critical than immigration based on labor and skilled workers. Later, Senator Philip Hart (D-MI) introduced the Immigration and Nationality bill, S.500, to the Senate.

Congressional Hearings 
During the subcommittee's hearing on Immigration and Naturalization of the Committee in the Judiciary United States Senate, many came forward to voice their support or opposition to the bill. Many higher-ranking officials in the executive and legislative branches, like Dean Rusk (Secretary of State) and Abba P. Schwartz (Administrator, Bureau of Security and Consular Affairs, U.S. Department of State), came forward with active support. Also, many cultural and civil rights organizations, like the Order Sons of Italy in America, and the Grand Council of Columbia Association in Civil Service, supported the act. Many of the bill's supporters believed that this future would outlaw racism and prejudice rhetoric that previous immigration quotas have caused; this prejudice has also caused other nations to feel like the United States did not respect them due to their low rating in the previous immigration quotas. Many also believed that this act would highly benefit the United States’ economy because the act focused on allowing skilled workers to enter the United States.

On the other hand, many lobbyists and organizations, like the Daughters of the American Revolution and the Baltimore Anti-Communistic League, came to the hearing to explain their opposition. Many of the opposition believed that this bill would be against American welfare. The common argument that they  used was that if the government allowed more immigrants into the United States, more employment opportunities would be taken away from the American workforce. While the farmers' organizations, like the American Farm Bureau Federation and the National Council of Agricultural, argued that this legislation would be hazardous for the agricultural industry due to the section regarding a limit of immigration of the Western Hemisphere. Before this act, there was no limitation with the immigration of the Western Hemisphere, which allowed many migrant workers in the agricultural industry to easily move from countries in the Western Hemisphere to farms in the United States during critical farming seasons. These agricultural organizations believed that this act could cause issues for migrant workers to enter the United States.

The voting of the Immigration and Nationality Act of 1965 
Once the Immigration and Nationality Act of 1965 was passed in the subcommittees and brought to floors of Congress, it was widely supported. Senator Philip Hart introduced the administration-backed immigration bill, which was reported to the Senate Judiciary Committee's Immigration and Naturalization Subcommittee. Representative Emanuel Celler introduced the bill in the United States House of Representatives, which voted 320 to 70 in favor of the act, while the United States Senate passed the bill by a vote of 76 to 18. In the Senate, 52 Democrats voted yes, 14 no, and 1 abstained. Among Senate Republicans, 24 voted yes, 3 voted no, and 1 abstained. In the House, 202 Democrats voted yes, 60 voted no, and 12 abstained, 118 Republicans voted yes, 10 voted no, and 11 abstained. In total, 74% of Democrats and 85% of Republicans voted for passage of this bill. Most of the no votes were from the American South, which was then still strongly Democratic. During debate on the Senate floor, Senator Ted Kennedy, speaking of the effects of the Act, said, "our cities will not be flooded with a million immigrants annually. ... Secondly, the ethnic mix of this country will not be upset."

Sen. Hiram Fong (R-HI) answered questions concerning the possible change in the United States' cultural pattern by an influx of Asians:

Democrat Rep. Michael A. Feighan (OH-20), along with some other Democrats, insisted that "family unification" should take priority over "employability", on the premise that such a weighting would maintain the existing ethnic profile of the country. That change in policy instead resulted in chain migration dominating the subsequent patterns of immigration to the United States. In removing racial and national discrimination the Act would significantly alter the demographic mix in the U.S.

When the act was on the floor, two possible amendments were created in order to impact the Western Hemisphere aspect of the legislation. In the House, the MacGregor Amendment was debated; this amendment called for the Western Hemisphere limit to be 115,000 immigrants annually. This amendment was rejected in a 189–218 record vote. Then the act was pushed to the Senate, where a similar amendment was proposed (possibly creating a cap of 115,000 immigrants annually from the Western Hemisphere), but this was also never passed.

Enactment 
On October 3, 1965, President Lyndon B. Johnson officially signed the Immigration and Nationality Act. Because his administration believed that this was a historic legislation, he signed the act at Liberty Island, New York. Upon signing the legislation into law, Johnson said, "this [old] system violates the basic principle of American democracy, the principle that values and rewards each man on the basis of his merit as a man. It has been un-American in the highest sense, because it has been untrue to the faith that brought thousands to these shores even before we were a country."

Provisions 
The Immigration and Nationality Act of 1965 amended the Immigration and Nationality Act of 1952 (known as the McCarran–Walter Act). It upheld some provisions of the Immigration Act of 1924, while at the same time creating new and more inclusive immigration regulations. It maintained per-country limits, which had been a feature of U.S. immigration policy since the 1920s, and it developed preference categories.

One of the main components of the act was aimed to abolish the national-origins quota. This meant that it eliminated national origin, race, and ancestry as a basis for immigration, making discriminating against obtaining visas illegal.

It created a seven-category preference system. In this system, it explains how visas should be given out in order of most importance. This system prioritized individuals who were relatives of U.S. citizens, legal permanent resident, professionals, and/or other individuals with specialized skills.

 The seven-category preference system is divided by family preferences and skill-based preferences. The family preferences include unmarried children of United States citizens, unmarried children and spouses of permanent residents, married children and their dependents of United States citizens, and siblings and their dependents of United States citizens. At the same time, the skilled preferences include individuals and their dependents who have extreme knowledge in arts and science, individuals and their dependent who are workers if there were a labor shortage. Lastly, skilled-based preferences include the preferences for refugees.

Immediate relatives and "special immigrants" were not subject to numerical restrictions. It  defined immediate relatives as children and spouses of United States citizens while also parents of United States citizens who are 21 years or older. While also defining "special immigrants" in six different categories, which includes:

An immigrant and dependent of the immigrant from the Western Hemisphere if the approved.
An immigrant who traveled abroad for a short period of time.
An immigrant who was considered a United States citizen or applying for citizenship.
An immigrant and dependents of the immigrant who is conducting religious practices and are needed by a religion sector to be in the United States.
An immigrant and their dependent who is/was a United States government employee abroad. They must have served 15 or more years to be considered a special immigrant. This category is only given if the Foreign Service Office recommended this specific immigrant to be qualified for this categorization.
An immigrant who is 14 years or younger has been considered an immediate relative of a U.S. citizen. However, their parent(s) cannot take care of them for multiple reasons, including death, abandonment, and so on.

It added a quota system for immigration from the Western Hemisphere, which was not included in the earlier national quota system. This was for the first time, immigration from the Western Hemisphere was limited, while the Eastern Hemisphere saw an increase in the number of visas granted.

It added a labor certification requirement, which dictated that the Secretary of Labor needed to certify labor shortages.

It explained how immigrants who are not immediate relatives of citizens and are considered special immigrants would apply and get approved to immigrate into the United States. Most approvals will need to be approved by the Attorney General, Congress, and Secretary of Labor.

Refugees were given the seventh and last category preference with the possibility of adjusting their status. However, refugees could enter the United States by other means, such as seeking temporary asylum.

Immediate impact on quota immigrant admissions

 
 
The Act of October 3, 1965 phased out the National Origins Formula quota system set by the Immigration and Nationality Act of 1952 in two stages: 
Effective December 1, 1965, during a transition period covering fiscal years ending June 30 of 1966–1968, national quotas continued, but any unused quota spots were pooled and made available to other countries that had exhausted their quota, on a first-come, first-serve basis. While still granting first priority to European countries according to the National Origins Formula, immigration from countries with high quotas had slowed to far below maximum allotments. In 1965, 296,697 immigrants were admitted out of a total quota of 158,561.
Effective July 1, 1968, the national quota system was fully abolished, and the broad hemispheric numerical limitations took effect. All nation-level quotas were dropped and replaced by a limit of 170,000 immigrants from the Eastern Hemisphere on a first-come, first-serve basis, but while setting cap of no more than 20,000 from any one country. For the first time, immigration from within the Western Hemisphere was also restricted, legally capped at 120,000 annually.
Listed below are quota immigrants admitted from the Eastern Hemisphere, by country, in given fiscal years ended June 30, for the final National Origins Formula quota year of 1965, the pool transition period 1966–1968, and for 1969–1970, the first two fiscal years in which national quotas were fully abolished.

Wages under Foreign Certification
As per the rules under the Immigration and Nationality Act, U.S. organizations are permitted to employ foreign workers either temporarily or permanently to fulfill certain types of job requirements. The Employment and Training Administration under the U.S. Department of Labor is the body that usually provides certification to employers allowing them to hire foreign workers in order to bridge qualified and skilled labor gaps in certain business areas. Employers must confirm that they are unable to hire American workers willing to perform the job for wages paid by employers for the same occupation in the intended area of employment. However, some unique rules are applied to each category of visas. They are as follows:

H-1B and H-1B1 Specialty (Professional) Workers should have a pay, as per the prevailing wage – an average wage that is paid to a person employed in the same occupation in the area of employment; or that the employer pays its workers the actual wage paid to people having similar skills and qualifications.
H-2A Agricultural Workers should have the highest pay in accordance to the (a) Adverse Effect Wage Rate, (b) the present rate for a particular crop or area, or (c) the state or federal minimum wage. The law also stipulates requirements like employer-sponsored meals and transportation of the employees as well as restrictions on deducting from the workers' wages.
H-2B Non-agricultural Workers should receive a payment in accordance with the prevailing wage (mean wage paid to a worker employed in a similar occupation in the concerned area of employment).
D-1 Crewmembers (longshore work) should be paid the current wage (mean wage paid to a person employed in a similar occupation in the respective area of employment).
Permanent Employment of Aliens should be employed after the employer has agreed to provide and pay as per the prevailing wage trends. It should be decided on the basis of one of the many alternatives provisioned under the said Act. This rule has to be followed the moment the Alien has been granted with permanent residency or the Alien has been admitted to the United States to take the required position.

Legacy

The proponents of the Immigration and Nationality Act of 1965 argued that it would not significantly influence United States culture. President Johnson said it was "not a revolutionary bill. It does not affect the lives of millions." Secretary of State Dean Rusk and other politicians, including Sen. Ted Kennedy (D-MA), asserted that the bill would not affect the U.S. demographic mix. However, following the passage of the law, the ethnic composition of immigrants changed, altering the ethnic makeup of the U.S. with increased numbers of immigrants from Asia, Africa, the West Indies, and elsewhere in the Americas. The 1965 act also imposed the first cap on total immigration from the Americas, marking the first time numerical limitations were placed on immigration from Latin American countries, including Mexico. If the bill and its subsequent immigration waves since had not been passed, it is estimated by Pew Research that the U.S. would have been in 2015: 75% Non-Hispanic White, 14% Black, 8% Hispanic and less than 1% Asian.

In the twenty years following passage of the law, 25,000 professional Filipino workers, including thousands of nurses, entered the U.S. under the law's occupational provision.Family reunification under the law greatly increased the total number of immigrants, including Europeans, admitted to the U.S.; Between 1960 and 1975, 20,000 Italians arrived annually to join relatives who had earlier immigrated. Total immigration doubled between 1965 and 1970, and again between 1970 and 1990. Immigration constituted 11 percent of the total U.S. population growth between 1960 and 1970, growing to 33 percent from 1970 to 1980, and to 39 percent from 1980 to 1990. The percentage of foreign-born in the United States increased from 5 percent in 1965 to 14 percent in 2016.

The elimination of the National Origins Formula and the introduction of numeric limits on immigration from the Western Hemisphere, along with the strong demand for immigrant workers by U.S. employers, led to rising numbers of undocumented immigrants in the U.S. in the decades after 1965, especially in the Southwest. Policies in the Immigration Reform and Control Act of 1986 that were designed to curtail migration across the Mexico–U.S. border led many unauthorized workers to settle permanently in the U.S. These demographic trends became a central part of anti-immigrant activism from the 1980s, leading to greater border militarization, rising apprehension of undocumented immigrants by the Border Patrol, and a focus in the media on the criminality of undocumented immigrants.

The Immigration and Nationality Act's elimination of national and ethnic quotas has limited recent efforts at immigration restriction. In January 2017, President Donald Trump's Executive Order 13769 temporarily halted immigration from seven majority-Muslim nations. However, lower federal courts ruled that the executive order violated the Immigration and Nationality Act's prohibitions of discrimination on the basis of nationality and religion. In June 2017, the U.S. Supreme Court overrode both appeals courts and allowed the second ban to go into effect, but carved out an exemption for persons with "bona fide relationships" in the U.S. In December 2017, the U.S. Supreme Court allowed the full travel ban—now in its  third incarnation—to take effect, which excludes people who have a bona fide relationship with a person or entity in the United States. In June 2018, the Supreme Court upheld the travel ban in Trump v. Hawaii, saying that the president's power to secure the country's borders, delegated by Congress over decades of immigration lawmaking, was not undermined by the president's history of arguably incendiary statements about the dangers he said some Muslims pose to the United States.

See also
 Uniform Congressional District Act
 History of laws concerning immigration and naturalization in the United States
 Luce–Celler Act of 1946
 Remain in Mexico

References

Further reading
 Chin, Gabriel J.  "The civil rights revolution comes to immigration law: A new look at the Immigration and Nationality Act of 1965." North Carolina Law Review 75 (1996): 273+ online.
 Chin, Gabriel J., and Rose Cuison Villazor, eds. The Immigration and Nationality Act of 1965: legislating a new America (Cambridge University Press, 2015).
 LeMay, Michael C. The Immigration and Nationality Act of 1965: A Reference Guide (ABC-CLIO, 2020).
 Orchowski, Margaret Sands. The law that changed the face of America: the Immigration and Nationality Act of 1965 (Rowman & Littlefield, 2015).
 Tichenor, Daniel. "The historical presidency: Lyndon Johnson's ambivalent reform: the Immigration and Nationality Act of 1965." Presidential Studies Quarterly 46.3 (2016): 691-705 online.
 Zolberg, Aristide R. A Nation by Design: Immigration Policy in the Fashioning of America (2008)

External links
 An Act to amend the Immigration and Nationality Act, and for other purposes  Text of Public Law 89-236 – October 3, 1965
 Immigration and Nationality Act of 1965 in the South Asian American Digital Archive (SAADA)
 Immigration Policy in the United States (2006), Congressional Budget office.
 The Great Society Congress

United States federal immigration and nationality legislation
1965 in American law
Presidency of Lyndon B. Johnson
89th United States Congress